Cancer Ward is a punk-rock, garage, industrial dance album, and the 22nd album from Jewish-American, bi-polar outsider punk musician, Steve Lieberman, released on 30 December 2014, when he was 56 years old.
It is a concept album, largely dealing with Lieberman's six-month long experimental chemotherapy at Memorial Sloan-Kettering between September 2013 and February 2014, the third round of treatment failing to halt the progression of his leukemia. The underlying theme is Lieberman's dealing with death and dying early because of the resistant, uncurable nature of his disease. The album took over one year to produce, as Lieberman was hospitalized frequently during 2014, as his cancer progressed to stage 3.

Track listing

Personnel
Steve Lieberman - bass guitar, guitar, vocals, flutes, recorders, melodica, beatmachines

Singles

References

2014 albums
Steve Lieberman albums
JDub Records albums